The 1929 New York City mayoral election was held on November 5 in concert with other municipal elections. Democratic incumbent Jimmy Walker defeated Republican challenger Fiorello H. La Guardia in what was considered "a Crushing Defeat to [the] City G.O.P. [delivered]" by Tammany Hall. Socialist candidate Norman Thomas also ran, as did Socialist Labor candidate Olive M. Johnson and former Police Commissioner Richard Edward Enright for the Square Deal Party.

Republican primary

Candidates
Fiorello LaGuardia, U.S. Representative from East Harlem
William M. Bennett, former State Senator from Manhattan and perennial candidate

La Guardia gave his acceptance speech at the Mecca Temple.

Results

General election

Results
Walker won with a plurality of 497,165 votes, which had been the largest ever recorded for a mayoral candidate up to that time, and won the absolute majority of votes in all five boroughs. The results were part of a larger Democratic landslide in which Democrats won the position of President of the Board of Aldermen, Comptroller, all positions in Brooklyn, and all Borough Presidencies except Queens, and gained 2 seats in the Assembly and 3 in the Board of Aldermen from Republicans. Thomas's results were the highest recorded by the Socialist party to that date.

Aftermath
Despite his success, Walker would be embroiled in scandal in 1932 and forced to resign.

Endorsements

References

Mayoral election
New York City mayoral election
New York City
Mayoral elections in New York City
New York City mayoral election